This is a list of foreign ministers of Honduras from 1944 to the present day.

1944–1948: Silverio Laínez
1948–1954: J. Edgardo Valenzuela
1954–1956: Esteban Mendoza
1956–1957: Jorge Fidel Durón
1957–1962: Andrés Alvarado Puerto
1962–1963: Roberto Perdomo Paredes
1963–1965: Jorge Fidel Durón
1965............ José Ángel Ulloa Donaire
1965–1971: Tiburcio Carías Castillo
1971–1972: Andrés Alvarado Puerto
1972–1974: César A. Batres
1974–1975: Ricardo Pineda Milla
1975–1976: Virgilio Gálvez
1976............ Roberto Perdomo Paredes
1976–1979: Roberto Palma Gálvez
1979–1980: Eliseo Pérez Cadalso
1980–1982: César Elvir Sierra
1982–1986: Edgardo Paz Barnica
1986–1990: Carlos López Contreras
1990–1994: Mario Carías Zapata
1994–1995: Ernesto Paz Aguilar
1995–1998: Delmer Urbizo Panting
1998–1999: Fernando Martínez Jiménez
1999–2002: Roberto Flores Bermúdez
2002–2003: Guillermo Pérez Arias
2003............ Aníbal Quiñónez
2003–2005: Leónidas Rosa Bautista
2005–2006: Mario Fortín
2006–2008: Milton Jiménez
2008–2009: Ángel Edmundo Orellana
2009............ Patricia Rodas
2009............ Enrique Ortez
2009–2010: Carlos López Contreras
2010–2011: Mario Canahuati
2011............ Alden Rivera 
2011–2013: Arturo Corrales
2013–2015: Mireya Agüero
2015–2016: Arturo Corrales
2016–2019: María Dolores Agüero
2019–2022: Lisandro Rosales
2022–present: Eduardo Enrique Reina

Sources
Rulers.org – Foreign ministers E–K

Foreign
Foreign Ministers
Politicians